Maltepe may refer to several places in Turkey:

Maltepe, Çan, a village in Çanakkale Province
Maltepe, Çankaya, a quarter in Çankaya, Ankara
Maltepe, Çay, a village in Afyonkarahisar Province
Maltepe, Istanbul, a district and municipality of Istanbul Province
Maltepe (Istanbul Metro), an underground rail station on the M4 line
Maltepe railway station, a surface rail station on the Haydarpaşa-Gebze and Haydarpaşa-Adapazarı lines
Maltepe University
Maltepe, Keşan, a village in Edirne Province
Maltepe, Yüreğir, a village in Adana Province
Maltepe (Kilise Tepe), a mound in Mersin Province